The Sanjak of Nakşa Berre or Naxos (Ottoman Turkish: Sancak-i/Liva-i Nakşa Berre) was a second-level Ottoman province (sanjak or liva) encompassing the central and southern Cyclades islands, and named after the two largest islands of Naxos and Paros (Tr. Berre). The sanjak encompassed the territory of the former Duchy of Naxos, which had been tributary to the Ottomans since 1537, but was not formally incorporated into the Empire until after 1579, when the last Duke, Joseph Nasi, died. The sanjak formed part of the Eyalet of the Archipelago at least by 1600, but is no longer attested after the late 18th century. Aside from the sanjakbey at Naxos, two other beys, at Milos and Santorini, are recorded in 1629. With the outbreak of the Greek War of Independence in 1821, the islands came under Greek control.

Sources
 
 
 

History of the Cyclades
Naksa
Naksa
States and territories established in 1579
States and territories disestablished in 1821
History of Naxos
1579 establishments in the Ottoman Empire
1821 disestablishments in the Ottoman Empire